Pentachloroethane is a non-flammable but toxic chemical compound of chlorine, hydrogen, and carbon.  It is used as a solvent for oil and grease, in metal cleaning, and in the separation of coal from impurities.

References

External links
CDC - NIOSH Pocket Guide to Chemical Hazards

Chloroalkanes